Dadi Dodou Gaye (born 21 May 1995) is a  professional footballer who plays as a leftback for the club KFUM Oslo. Born in Norway, Gaye represents the Gambia national football team.

International career
Gaye was born in Norway and is of Gambian descent. He debuted for the Gambia national football team in a friendly 1–0 win over Morocco on 12 June 2019.

References

External links
 
 
 KFUM Profile
 

1995 births
Living people
Footballers from Oslo
People with acquired Gambian citizenship
Gambian footballers
The Gambia international footballers
Norwegian footballers
Norwegian people of Gambian descent
Follo FK players
KFUM-Kameratene Oslo players
Norwegian First Division players
Norwegian Second Division players
Association football fullbacks